Kanlayana Maitri Road is a road in Bangkok's  Phra Borom Maha Ratchawang sub-district, Phra Nakhon district. It's a short road between the headquarters of the Ministry of Defense and the Royal Thai Survey Department. It connects Sanam Chai road and Saphan Chang Rongsi (Chang Rongsi bridge), at the end of the bridge is the junction of Atsadang and Bamrung Mueang roads, and is considered the beginning of Bamrung Mueang road.

Its name "Kanlayana Maitri" is the name in honour of Phraya Kalyanamaitri (พระยากัลยาณไมตรี) or Francis B. Sayre Sr., an American who come to live and work in Siam (today's Thailand) during the reign of King Vajiravudh (Rama VI), he was a major contributor to foreign affairs of Siam at that time. Since Saranrom Palace (today's Saranrom Park) neighborhoods were formerly the headquarters of the Ministry of Foreign Affairs.

Kanlayana Maitri road is recognized as one of the most beautiful roads in Bangkok includes Thailand. Since building of the Ministry of Defense is on the side. It was built with Neo-classical mixed Palladian architectures. The building is beautifully decorated with yellow and hundreds of windows opened and closed alternately, so often used as a place to photograph or filming.

References 

Phra Nakhon district
Streets in Bangkok